The Cathedral Basilica of Our Lady of Miracles, also Caacupé Cathedral, is the religious building that functions as the Catholic cathedral of the city of Caacupé, Paraguay, and also as the seat of the Roman Catholic Diocese of Caacupé that was created as a territorial prelature in 1960 and was promoted to its current status in 1967 through the bull "Rerum catholicarum" of Pope Paul VI.

The Sanctuary of the Virgin of Caacupé is a Catholic basilica in Paraguay that was inaugurated on 8 December 1765 and became a place of pilgrimage for many local believers. Caacupé is considered the spiritual capital of Paraguay because it houses the largest sanctuary in the country.

The temple, in addition to its status as a cathedral, is considered as a Catholic national sanctuary and minor basilica . It is under the pastoral responsibility of Bishop Ricardo Jorge Valenzuela Ríos. The church has been visited by two different popes: John Paul II in May 1988 and Francis in July 2015.

See also
Roman Catholicism in Paraguay
Our Lady of Miracles

References

Roman Catholic cathedrals in Paraguay
Roman Catholic churches completed in 1765
Basilica churches in South America
18th-century Roman Catholic church buildings in Paraguay